Exidia recisa (common name willow brain or amber jelly roll) is a jelly fungus in the family Auriculariaceae. It is a common, wood-rotting species throughout the northern hemisphere, typically growing on dead attached twigs and branches of willow and 
other broadleaf trees.

Taxonomy
The species was originally found growing on willow in Germany and was described in 1813 by L.P.F. Ditmar as Tremella recisa. It was transferred to the genus Exidia by Fries in 1822. Tremella salicum (the epithet means "of willow") has long been considered a synonym.

The epithet "recisa" means "cut-off", with reference to the shape of the fruit bodies.

Description
Exidia recisa forms orange-brown or amber, gelatinous fruit bodies that are firm and shallowly conical at first, becoming lax and pendulous with age, and around 2.5 cm (1 in) across. The fruit bodies typically grow gregariously, but do not normally coalesce. The upper, spore-bearing surface is smooth and shiny, whilst the undersurface is smooth and matt. Fruit bodies are attached to the wood at a point, but do not have a stem. The spore print is white.

Microscopic characters
The microscopic characters are typical of the genus Exidia. The basidia are ellipsoid, septate, 8–15 x 6–10 μm. The spores are allantoid (sausage-shaped), 14–15 x 3–3.5 μm.

Similar species
Fruit bodies of Exidia repanda are similarly coloured and microscopically indistinguishable. The fruit bodies are button-shaped, however, never becoming conical and pendulous, and the species typically occurs on birch, never on willow. Fruit bodies of Exidia umbrinella are also similar, but the species only occurs on conifers and is uncommon. The widespread Exidia glandulosa has much darker, blackish brown fruit bodies with sparse warts or small, peg-like projections on their surface.

Habitat and distribution
Exidia recisa is a wood-rotting species, typically found on dead attached twigs and branches. It was originally recorded on willow and most frequently occurs on this substrate, although it has also been reported on poplar, alder, and Prunus species. Exidia recisa typically fruits in autumn and winter. It is widely distributed in North and Central America, Europe, and northern Asia.

References

Auriculariales
Fungi described in 1813
Fungi of Asia
Fungi of Europe
Fungi of North America
Fungi of South America